Trachycarpus princeps is a species of palm endemic to Yunnan in southern central China. The epithet is Latin for "prince" and alludes to "the stately bearing of this palm and the majestic way it looks down from its lofty position on the sheer cliff faces" (Gibbons 1993). The species was described in 1995 by Gibbons, Spanner & Chen.

The leaves are semicircular,  diameter, with 45–48 linear-lanceolate segments that extend halfway into the depth of the blade, which is bright medium green above and glaucous, bluish-white beneath.

References

princeps
Endemic flora of Yunnan
Trees of China
Plants described in 1995